The Magnoliaceae are a flowering plant family, the magnolia family,  in the order Magnoliales. It consists of two genera: Magnolia and Liriodendron (tulip trees).

Unlike most angiosperms, whose flower parts are in whorls (rings), the Magnoliaceae have their stamens and pistils in spirals on a conical receptacle. This arrangement is found in some fossil plants and is believed to be a basal or early condition for angiosperms. The flowers also have parts not distinctly differentiated into sepals and petals, while angiosperms that evolved later tend to have distinctly differentiated sepals and petals. The poorly differentiated perianth parts that occupy both positions are known as tepals.

The family has about 219 species and ranges across subtropical eastern North America, Mexico and Central America, the West Indies, tropical South America, southern and eastern India, Sri Lanka, Indochina, Malesia, China, Japan, and Korea.

Genera

The number of genera in Magnoliaceae is a subject of debate. Up to 17 have been recognized, including Alcimandra, Lirianthe, Manglietia, Michelia, Pachylarnax, Parakmeria, Talauma and Yulania. However, many recent studies have opted to merge all genera within subfamily Magnolioideae into the genus Magnolia. Thus, Magnoliaceae would include only two extant genera, Magnolia and Liriodendron.

Description 

The monophyly of Magnoliaceae is supported by a number of shared morphological characters among the various genera in the family.  Most have bisexual flowers (with the exception of Kmeria and some species of Magnolia section Gynopodium), showy, fragrant, radial, and with an elongated receptacle. Leaves are alternate, simple, and sometimes lobed. The inflorescence is a solitary, showy flower with indistinguishable petals and sepals. Sepals range from six to many; stamens are numerous and feature short filaments which are poorly differentiated from the anthers. Carpels are usually numerous, distinct, and on an elongated receptacle or torus. The fruit is an etaerio of follicles which usually become closely appressed as they mature and open along the abaxial surface. Seeds have a fleshy coat, aril, and color that ranges from red to orange (except Liriodendron). Magnoliaceae flowers are  beetle pollinated, except for Liriodendron, which is bee pollinated. The carpels of Magnolia flowers are especially thick to avoid damage by beetles that land, crawl, and feast on them. The seeds of Magnolioideae are bird-dispersed, while the seeds of Liriodendron are wind-dispersed.

Biogeography 
Due to its great age, the geographical distribution of the Magnoliaceae has become disjunct or fragmented as a result of major geologic events such as ice ages, continental drift, and mountain formation. This distribution pattern has isolated some species, while keeping others in close contact.
Extant species of the Magnoliaceae are widely distributed in temperate and tropical Asia from the Himalayas to Japan and southwest through Malaysia and New Guinea. Asia is home to about two-thirds of the species in Magnoliaceae, with the remainder of the family spread across the Americas with temperate species extending into southern Canada and tropical elements extending into Brazil and the West Indies.

Systematics 
Due to the family-wide morphological similarity, no consensus has yet emerged on the number of genera in the family. The development of DNA sequencing at the end of the 20th century had a profound impact on the research of phylogenetic relationships within the family. The employment of ndhF and cpDNA sequences has refuted many of the traditionally accepted phylogenetic relationships within the Magnoliaceae. For example, the genera Magnolia and Michelia were shown to be paraphyletic when the remaining four genera of the Magnolioideae are split out. In fact, even many of the subgenera (Magnolia subg. Magnolia, Magnolia subg. Talauma) have been found to be paraphyletic. Although no completely resolved phylogeny for the family has yet been determined, these technological advances have allowed systematists to broadly circumscribe major lineages.

Economic significance 

As a whole, the Magnoliaceae are not an economically significant family. With the exception of ornamental cultivation, the economic significance of magnolias is generally confined to the use of wood from certain timber species and the use of bark and flowers from several species believed to possess medicinal qualities.  The wood of the American tuliptree, Liriodendron tulipifera and the wood of the cucumbertree magnolia, Magnolia acuminata, and, to a lesser degree, that of the Frasier magnolia, Magnolia fraseri, are harvested and marketed collectively as "yellow poplar." This is a lightweight and exceptionally fine-grained wood, lending itself to precision woodworking for purposes such as pipe organ building.

Magnolias have a rich cultural tradition in China, where references to their healing qualities go back thousands of years. The Chinese have long used the bark of Magnolia officinalis, a magnolia native to the mountains of China with large leaves and fragrant white flowers, as a remedy for cramps, abdominal pain, nausea, diarrhea, and indigestion. Certain magnolia flowers, such as the buds of Magnolia liliiflora, have been used to treat chronic respiratory and sinus infections and lung congestion. Recently, magnolia bark has become incorporated into alternative medicine in the west, where tablets made from the bark of M. officinalis have been marketed as an aid for anxiety, allergies, asthma, and weight loss. Compounds found in magnolia bark might have antibacterial and antifungal properties, but no large-scale study on the health effects of magnolia bark or flowers has yet been conducted.

References 

 Hunt, D. (ed). 1998. Magnolias and their allies. International Dendrology Society & Magnolia Society.

Further reading
Cicuzza, D., Newton, A. and Oldfield, S. 2007. The Red List of Magnoliaceae Flora & Fauna International (FFI) and Botanic Gardens Conservation International (BGCI) report. 
F. Xu, P. J. Rudall. Comparative floral anatomy and ontogeny in Magnoliaceae. Plant Systematics and Evolution April 2006, Volume 258, Issue 1-2, pp 1-15

 
Magnoliid families
Extant Berriasian first appearances